Mark Benedict Coleridge (born 25 September 1948) is an Australian Catholic bishop. Since 11 May 2012 he has served as the sixth Roman Catholic Archbishop of Brisbane in Queensland. He previously served as the Archbishop of Canberra–Goulburn (2006–2012) and as an auxiliary bishop of the Archdiocese of Melbourne (2002–2006).

Early life
Mark Coleridge was born in Melbourne, Victoria. The third of five siblings born to Bernard and Marjorie (née Harvey) Coleridge, he was educated at Saint Joseph's School, Tranmere, South Australia, Rostrevor College, Adelaide, and St Kevin's College, Toorak. Contemplating a career in the Australian diplomatic service, he graduated from the University of Melbourne in 1968 with a Bachelor of Arts degree in English in French. As a Melbourne seminarian, he entered Corpus Christi College, then in Werribee and later in Glen Waverley and Clayton.

On 18 May 1974, Coleridge was ordained a priest at St Patrick's Cathedral, Melbourne, by Bishop John A. Kelly, an auxiliary bishop of Melbourne. He worked as a parish priest there until moving to Rome where he earned a Licentiate in Sacred Scripture at the Biblicum in 1984 and a Doctorate in Sacred Scripture with dissertation on the Infancy Narrative in Luke's Gospel in April 1992. He returned to Melbourne in 1992, where he spent three years at several theology appointments. After some time in Rome devoted to doctoral studies and another stint in Melbourne, in 1997 he was appointed to a position in the Roman Curia at the Secretariat of State, where he spent four years.

Episcopate
On 3 May 2002, Pope John Paul II appointed Coleridge as an auxiliary bishop of the Archdiocese of Melbourne. On 19 June 2006, Pope Benedict XVI named him as Archbishop of Canberra and Goulburn.  On 29 December 2011 he was appointed a member of the Pontifical Council for Social Communications for a five-year renewable term. On 2 April 2012, Pope Benedict XVI named him Metropolitan Archbishop of Brisbane and he was installed on 11 May 2012.

As of 2015 he was a member of the Australian Catholic Bishops' Conference, Coleridge serves on that body's permanent committee, chairs its Commission for Evangelisation, and is a member of its Commission for Church Ministry.

The Australian Catholic Bishops' Conference elected Coleridge one of its two delegates to the Synod on the Family in Rome in October 2015. There he served as the relator (reporting secretary) for one of the four English-language working groups.

In November 2017, Coleridge was elected by Australia's bishops to head their commission that will organize a plenary council of the Church in Australia in 2020. On 4 May 2018 he was elected to a two-year term as president of the Bishops' Conference.

Opposition to same-sex marriage

In 2017, during the national postal survey on same-sex marriage, Coleridge said he personally believed that the love shared by a same-sex couple could only ever be simply "the love of friends". He noted that children were not permitted to marry their parents, nor siblings permitted to marry one another, though he agreed that the cases of same-sex couples and close relatives were different. He said: "That is not to say that [same-sex couples] are not equal. It's simply saying that they are not the same and that they don't qualify for what we call marriage."

Gallery

References

External links

1948 births
Living people
20th-century Roman Catholic bishops in Australia
Religious leaders from Melbourne
21st-century Roman Catholic archbishops in Australia
People educated at St Kevin's College, Melbourne
Members of the Pontifical Council for Social Communications
Members of the Pontifical Council for Culture
Roman Catholic archbishops of Canberra and Goulburn
University of Melbourne alumni
Roman Catholic archbishops of Brisbane
Pontifical Biblical Institute alumni
Australian Roman Catholic archbishops